Henry Langley may refer to:

 Henry Langley (architect) (1836–1907), Canadian architect
 Henry Langley (bishop) (1840–1906), first Anglican bishop of Bendigo
 Henry Langley (Dean of Melbourne) (1877–1968), Anglican priest in Australia
 Henry Langley (Master of Pembroke) (1611–1679), English academic, priest and Master of Pembroke College, Oxford
 Henry Langley (cricketer) (1846–1884), English cricketer

See also
 Harry Langley, architect